The 1933 Penn Quakers football team was an American football team that represented the University of Pennsylvania as an independent during the 1933 college football season. In its third season under head coach Harvey Harman, the team compiled a 2–4–1 record and were outscored by a total of 80 to 57. The team played its home games at Franklin Field in Philadelphia.

Schedule

References

Penn
Penn Quakers football seasons
Penn Quakers football